John Debrett (8 January 1753 – 15 November 1822) was an English publisher and compiler. His name has become associated with reference books.

Life
Debrett was of French Huguenot background and took over the business of John Almon, opposite Burlington House in Piccadilly, in 1781. His shop continued to be the resort of the whigs, the Pittites going chiefly to his neighbour, Stockdale.

Debrett retired from business about 1814, and lived partly upon a pension from his wife and partly from his compilations. He is described as a kindly, good-natured man, but without business aptitudes. He died at his lodgings in Upper Gloucester Street, Regent's Park, on 15 November 1822.

Publications
Among Debrett's publications were a new edition of The New Foundling Hospital for Wit (1784), 6 vols., and Asylum for Fugitive Pieces in Prose and Verse (1785–1788), 4 vols.  At the end of the former work, The New Peerage (1784), 3 vols., is advertised. This had been Almon's, who published peerages, but is not known to have had any share in their compilation. He is also known as the publisher of the first British printing of the United States Constitution in 1787.

The first edition of Debrett's Peerage of England, Scotland, and Ireland, containing an Account of all the Peers, 2 vols., was published in May 1802, with plates of arms, a second edition appeared in September 1802, a third in June 1803, a fourth in 1805, a fifth in 1806, a sixth in 1808, a seventh in 1809, an eighth in 1812, a ninth in 1814, a tenth in 1816, an eleventh in 1817, a twelfth in 1819, a thirteenth in 1820, a fourteenth in 1822, a fifteenth in 1823, which was the last edition edited by Debrett, and not published until after his death. The next edition came out in 1825. The first edition of The Baronetage of England, containing their Descent and Present State, by John Debrett, 2 vols., appeared in 1808. For a time the British Imperial Calendar was edited by Debrett.

See also
Debrett's

References

"Debrett, John Field (1752-1822)" in Chamber's Encyclopaedia. International Learning Systems. 1968. Volume 4. Page 409. Google Books
The Editors of the American Heritage Dictionaries. "Debrett, John (c. 1750-1822)" in The Riverside Dictionary of Biography. Houghton Mifflin. 2005. Page 220.
"Mr. John Debrett" (1822) Gentleman's Magazine, volume 92 (New Series, volume 15), part 2, p 474
"Debrett, John" The Annual Biography and Obituary for the Year 1823. London: Longman, Hurst, Rees, Orme and Brown. 1823. Volume 7. Page 441.
Timperly, Charles Henry. A Dictionary of Printers and Printing. London: H Johnson. 1839. Pages 823 and 886.
Nichols, John Bowyer. Illustrations of the Literary History of the Eighteenth Century. J B Nichols and Sons. London. 1858. Volume 8. Page 497.
"A Toast to John Debrett" (1953) 49 The Listener 129 Google Books
"Debrett" in Fourth Leaders from the Times: A Selection from the Past Twelve Months. Times Publishing Company. 1953. Page 77. Google Books
Charles Arnold-Baker. "Debrett, John" in The Companion to British History. Routledge. 2015. Page 402.
"Debrett, John" (1881) Notes and Queries 464 Google Books
The Antiquarian Book Review Monthly. 1974. Volumes 1 and 2. Pages ccxxx and ccxxxi. Google Books
(1921) 70 The Bookseller 71 Google Books
Bamber Gascoigne. Encyclopedia of Britain. Macmillan. 1994. Page 179. Google Books
Cross, Nigel. The Common Writer. Cambridge University Press. 1985. Page 43. Google Books
Edinburgh Annual Register, 1822. Page 462.
"Register - Deaths" (Dec 1822) The Edinburgh Magazine and Literary Miscellany (The Scots Magazine, New Series), vol 9, p 752
"Register - Deaths" (1822) 12 Blackwood's Edinburgh Magazine 803
Cyril Francis James Hankinson. My Forty Years with Debrett. Robert Hale Limited. London. 1963. Pages 11 to 14. Google Books
Committee of Council on Education. First Proofs of the Universal Catalogue of Books on Art. Chapman and Hall. London. 1870. Volume 1. Page 390.
Paul Hubert Smith. "Charles Thomson to John Debrett" in Letters of Delegates to Congress, 1774- 1789. Library of Congress. 1994. Volume 21. Page 204. Google Books
Wilmarth Sheldon Lewis (ed). The Yale Edition of Horace Walpole's Correspondence with William Mason. Yale University Press. 1955. Volume 29. Page 213. Google Books

1753 births
1822 deaths
English publishers (people)